Finnfund, Finnish Fund for Industrial Cooperation Ltd  (in Finnish Teollisen yhteistyön rahasto Oy) is a Finnish development financier and impact investor, that offers long-term investment loans and venture capital to private companies for projects in developing countries. Finnfund’s statutory duty is to promote economic and social development in developing countries.

History

1980–1999 
Finnfund was founded in 1980. In 1986, the company employed approximately 15 people. In the 1980s, the company made investment decisions worth approximately 40–50 million Finnish markkas on an annual basis.

Finnfund’s objective was to finance joint ventures established and operating in developing countries by investing, granting loans, providing guarantees for loans, allocating funds to the start-up of new businesses and financing development banks operating in developing countries. Finnish law obliged Finnfund to ensure that public funds transferred through the company could be classified as official development assistance.

By 1990, Finnfund had financed 30 companies operating in developing countries. Equity investments made up one third of the invested 220 million Finnish markkas and the rest were loans. According to Finnfund, its investments generated a sevenfold investment in its project countries on average. In total, 1.6 billion Finnish markkas were invested in companies financed by Finnfund. At the time, the development of Finnish companies’ productive activities was fostered in developing countries. Therefore, most of the projects financed by Finnfund concerned the heavy metalworking industry. In practice this meant investment into, for example, Kone lifts, Valmet forest machines and Wärtsilä diesel power stations. Finnfund estimated that investments in lighter manufacturing industries and service industries, such as tourism, would also become significant in future.

In 1992, Finnfund began to support financing activities in Eastern and Central Europe. The first projects took place in Estonia, Russia, Poland, Hungary, and the Czech Republic. The company concentrated on promoting investments in manufacturing and service industries outside the OECD area, in other words, in Central and Eastern Europe, Asia, Latin America, Africa and the Middle East.

In addition to Finnfund, other Finnish state-financed special credit institutions operating in the 1990s included the Finnish Guarantee Board, Finnish Export Credit Ltd and Kera Oy.

In 1994, the majority of Finnfund’s investment projects took place in Estonia, Russia, India, Turkey, Malaysia, and Tunisia. Finnfund also made its first investments into projects in South Africa.

In 1996, Finnfund employed 33 people, and its balance amounted to approximately one billion Finnish marks. The company took out loans from abroad and made investment decisions worth nearly 100 million Finnish markkas on an annual basis. Japanese insurance companies turned out to be the most favourable sources of funding as their loans had longer loan periods and they were softer than standard bank loans.

2000– 
In 2000, Finnfund focused on the financing of productive investments in developing countries, such as China, Malaysia, Turkey, Poland, and Hungary. The company’s owners were the Finnish State, Finnvera, Leonia and Confederation of Finnish Industries.

Since 2006, the Ministry for Foreign Affairs of Finland began to finance Finnpartnership, which is a business partnership programme managed by Finnfund, to improve financial cooperation between companies and developing countries.

In 2014, Finnfund joined its largest project to date: the construction of the largest wind farm in Africa. The wind farm worth 660 million euros was also the largest private investment ever made in Kenya. The project’s other financiers include European Investment Bank (EIB) ja African Development Bank (AfDB). Finnfund has invested approximately 20 million euros into the project.

By 2016, Finnfund had received nearly EUR 165 million in funding from the Finnish State and its assets were worth approximately 250 million euros.  In late 2016, the value of Finnfund’s investments was nearly EUR 400 million euros.

By spring 2019, Finnfund had invested approximately 80 million euros into forestry projects in Africa. Finnfund’s goal was to make profitable investments with a positive impact on the climate and local development. For example, the company strived to create jobs. Finnfund had invested nearly 10 million euros into Miro Industry, founded in 2010, which was able to employed more than 1,000 people in West Africa. In autumn 2019, the government programme of Rinne Cabinet  dictated that financial investments would continue to be allocated to sustainable development projects in developing countries. With the additional support of private and corporate funding, Finnfund's operating conditions are secured. In October 2019, the Finnish State granted Finnfund a loan worht of 210 million euros, half of which was reserved for investments that empower women in developing countries to access entrepreneurship and leadership opportunities, quality jobs, and products and services that enhance their economic participation. Finnfund invested the rest of the loan into businesses mitigating climate change.

Organization 
Finnfund is owned by the Finnish State (95.7%), Finnvera (4.2 %) and the Confederation of Finnish Industries (EK) (0.1 %). The company does not distribute its profits among the shareholders. Instead, it uses the profits to make new investments in developing countries.

In 2021, the company employed approximately 90 people in Helsinki.

Finnfund's funding comes from the Finnish state, private capital markets and the return on its investments.

OP Finnfund Global Impact Fund I is an impact investment fund operated by Finnfund. The fund’s objective is to tackle issues such as the climate change, food security, gender equality and access to financing in developing countries.

Critic 
Finnfund has been accused of not being transparent enough. According to Finnfund, its investees pay taxes and Finnfund typically finances the construction phase of a project, in which case taxable income is not yet generated.
Finnfund manages some investments for example through the tax haven of Mauritius, which the company justifies on the grounds that the tax legislation and authority activities of the target country are underdeveloped or very unclear.
Indigenous and environmental activist Berta Cáceres, who opposed a Finnfund-funded hydropower project in Honduras, was assassinated in March 2016 in Honduras. Finnfund and the Dutch FMO suspended funding for the project immediately afterwards. According to Finnfund, the local communities had been consulted before the financing decision was made, and according to the company, most of the locals supported the project. Finnfund withdrew from the project in the summer of 2017.

Investment in the tax haven of Cayman Islands 
In November 2017, the Paradise Papers leak revealed that in 2012 Finnfund had invested 8 million euros in the Tropical Asia Forest Fund (TAFF) which is registered in a British tax haven in the  Cayman Islands. The fund was to implement forest projects in Indonesia, Laos and Malaysia. According to the information leak, the company being financed had been promised not to pay taxes for the next 50 years. Finnfund itself did not disclose documents related to the TAFF, justifying it based on business secrecy. According to CEO Kangasniemi, the Cayman Islands have arrangements that are predictable for the fund investor, and you are not supposed to pay taxes on the Cayman Islands, but the income flows through the state and the investees and investors pay their taxes in their own countries.

The day after the news was published, Ministrer for Foreign Affairs in Finland Kai Mykkänen said that Finnfund would no longer invest through tax havens listed by the OECD OECD and that its tax guidelines were being updated so that it could not aggressively avoid taxes in the future. The aim of the change was that in the future all arrangements in which Finnfund is involved can be reported openly.

References

External links 

 Finnfund
Funds
Government-owned companies of Finland
Finance